Six Bullets is a 2012 American action film directed by Ernie Barbarash, produced by Brad Krevoy and starring Jean-Claude Van Damme, Joe Flanigan, Anna-Louise Plowman, and Charlotte Beaumont. The film was released on direct-to-video in the United States on September 11, 2012.

Plot
Veteran mercenary Samson Gaul (Jean-Claude Van Damme) is retired from combat when his actions resulted in the deaths of helpless victims, but now he's the last hope for a desperate father. Mixed martial artist, Andrew Fayden (Joe Flanigan) knows how to fight, but alone he's unprepared to navigate the corrupt streets of a foreign city to find his kidnapped daughter. Together, these two try to stop a network of criminals that prey upon the innocent.

Cast
 Jean-Claude Van Damme as Samson Gaul
 Joe Flanigan as Andrew Fayden
 Anna-Louise Plowman as Monica Fayden
 Charlotte Beaumont as Becky Fayden
 Steve Nicolson as Inspector Kvitko
 Uriel Emil Pollack as Vlad
 Louis Dempsey as Stelu
 Mark Lewis as Bogdanov
 Kristopher Van Varenberg (Kristopher Van Damme) as Selwyn Gaul
 Bianca Van Varenberg (Bianca Van Damme) as Amalia
 Lia Sinchevici as Marina
 Andrei Runcanu as Luca
 Florin Busuioc as Hotel Manager
 Matei Calin as Victor
 Celesta Shanti Hodge as Fiona
 Sorin Cristen as Lead Agent

Home media
DVD was released in Region 1 in the United States on 11 September 2012, it was distributed by Sony Pictures Home Entertainment. DVD was released by StudioCanal in the United Kingdom in Region 2 on 1 October 2012.

References

External links
 
 
 

2012 films
2012 action thriller films
American action thriller films
American martial arts films
Films set in Hungary
Films set in Moldova
Films set in Romania
Films shot in Bucharest
Sony Pictures direct-to-video films
Films about child abduction
Films about alcoholism
Films about child sexual abuse
Films directed by Ernie Barbarash
2012 martial arts films
2010s English-language films
2010s American films